2006–07 was Bolton Wanderers Football Club's eighth season in the Premier League, and their sixth consecutive season in the top division of English football and covers the period from 1 July 2006 to 30 June 2007. Their failure to win the Premier League title made it the 68th time that they have competed at the top level of English football without winning the title, the most of any club.

Premier League
Bolton overcame the previous season's disappointment of failing to qualify for Europe and finished in seventh, enough for UEFA Cup football. Bolton had spent much of the season challenging for a Champions League and had peaked as high as third, but for a club of Bolton's size and resources to be challenging at the top end of the table was something for Bolton supporters to be proud of.

Three games before the end of the season, manager Sam Allardyce announced his resignation as Bolton manager and was replaced by Sammy Lee for the final three games of the season.

Results summary

Results per matchday

Final league table

FA Cup

League Cup

First-team squad
Squad at end of season

Left club during season

Squad statistics

Statistics accurate as of match played 13 May 2007

References

Bolton Wanderers F.C. seasons
Bolton Wanderers